Canary Wharf is a Docklands Light Railway (DLR) station in Canary Wharf in East London. Located next to One Canada Square and between two parts of a shopping centre, it serves the Canary Wharf office complex. Each of its three tracks feature platforms on both sides, allowing for easy interchanges and access to surrounding buildings. The station is sheltered by a distinctive elliptical glass roof.

The station is located on the DLR between Heron Quays station and West India Quay station. Canary Wharf is presently a terminus for the Stratford-Lewisham Line and services now only run to Lewisham in peak hours. The station is shown on the Tube map as being within walking distance of Canary Wharf Underground station; however, Heron Quays DLR station is indicated as closer by around 50 metres. It is also within walking distance of Canary Wharf station on the Elizabeth line, although West India Quay DLR and Poplar DLR stations are considered to be closer.

History

Canary Wharf station had been part of the original DLR plans, but when the system opened in August 1987 the station was not ready. It was originally planned that the station would be similar to the original station at Heron Quays, with two small platforms either side of the tracks. It soon became apparent that the Canary Wharf development would produce demand well above the capacity of a simple station. On 17 July 1987 (over a month before the DLR opened to the public) a contract was awarded to GEC-Mowlem Railway Group to rebuild the station into the considerably more elaborate and spacious design that exists today. It was opened in November 1991.

Services
Canary Wharf is served by two lines of the DLR — Bank to Lewisham and Stratford to Lewisham. Service to Bank comes at 3.5-minute intervals from 6.30am to 10.00am; four-minute intervals from 4.30pm to 7.30pm; seven-minute intervals from 7.30pm to 9pm; and ten-minute intervals from 5.30am to 6.30am, 10am to 4pm, and 9pm to 12.30am. There are also occasional services between Tower Gateway and Lewisham or Crossharbour.

Connections
London Buses routes 135, 277, D3, D7, D8 and night routes N277 and N550 serve the station.

See also
Canary Wharf railway station
Canary Wharf tube station

References

External links

 Canary Wharf station on Docklands Light Railway's website

Canary Wharf
Canary Wharf buildings
Docklands Light Railway stations in the London Borough of Tower Hamlets
Railway stations in Great Britain opened in 1991
1991 establishments in England